Sergio Andreoli (3 May 1922 – 18 May 2002) was an Italian footballer who played as a defender.

He played for 6 seasons (179 games, 9 games) in the Serie A for A.S. Roma.

He was Roma's captain from 1948 to 1950.

Honours
Roma
 Serie A champion: 1941–42.

References

1922 births
2002 deaths
Italian footballers
Serie A players
A.C. Perugia Calcio players
A.S. Roma players
Reggina 1914 players
Association football defenders